Hako is a village in the Arevut Municipality of the Aragatsotn Province of Armenia. It is mostly populated by Yazidis. The population of Hako was 95 as per the 2011 census, down from 229 reported in the 2001 census.

References

Populated places in Aragatsotn Province
Yazidi populated places in Armenia